Fahd El Bahja (born 14 July 1993) is an Italian professional footballer who most recently played as a midfielder, winger, or striker for Zimbru Chișinău.

Career
As a youth player, El Bahja joined the youth academy of Ligue 1 side Paris Saint-Germain. In 2012, he signed for Noto in the Italian fourth tier after receiving interest from Moroccan top flight club Wydad. In 2016, he signed for Lammari in the Italian fifth tier. Before the second half of 2016–17, El Bahja signed for Italian third tier team Maceratese.

In 2017, he signed for Locarno in the Swiss fifth tier. Before the second half of 2018–19, he signed for Italian fifth tier outfit Marsala. Before the second half of 2021–22, El Bahja signed for Zimbru Chișinău in the Moldovan top flight. On 18 March 2022, he debuted for Zimbru Chișinău in a 5–1 loss to Petrocub.

References

External links
 Fahd El Bahja at playmakerstats.com

Living people
1993 births
People from Sarzana
Italian people of Moroccan descent
Sportspeople from the Province of La Spezia
Italian footballers
Footballers from Liguria
Association football forwards
Association football midfielders
Association football wingers
Serie D players
Eccellenza players
Moldovan Super Liga players
S.S. Maceratese 1922 players
FC Locarno players
S.S.D. Marsala Calcio players
FC Zimbru Chișinău players
Italian expatriate footballers
Italian expatriate sportspeople in France
Expatriate footballers in France
Italian expatriate sportspeople in Moldova
Expatriate footballers in Moldova
Italian expatriate sportspeople in Switzerland
Expatriate footballers in Switzerland